Paul Klengel (13 May 1854 – 24 April 1935) was a German violinist, violist, pianist, conductor, composer, editor and arranger.  He was the brother of cellist Julius Klengel.

Biography
Klengel was born and died in Leipzig, where he studied at the Leipzig Conservatory of Music and the University of Leipzig receiving his doctorate in 1886 with the dissertation Zur Ästhetik der Tonkunst (The Aesthetic of Music).  From 1881 to 1886 he was choral conductor for the Euterpe Music Society in Leipzig and from 1888 to 1891 he worked at the Hofkapelle Stuttgart. He conducted for the German choral societies in New York City from 1898 to 1902. Klengel then returned to Leipzig to conduct the Arion Society and later joined the Leipzig Conservatory as professor of violin and piano.

Klengel was a versatile musician; he was an accomplished violinist and pianist who sought a career as a concert musician and soloist. He composed works for violin, viola, and piano, as well as many songs and choral works.  Klengel was a "house arranger" for Simrock publishing house. He is noted for his artistic arrangements for violin and viola, many of which are still used for teaching.

Original compositions
Chamber music
 Fünf Stücke (5 Pieces) for 2 violins, Op. 9 (published 1888)
     Romanze
     Humoreske
     Menuett
     Ständchen
     Scherzo
 Fünf Characterstücke (5 Character Pieces) for violin and piano, Op. 11 (1894); Nos 3 and 5 also for cello and piano
     Sérénade mélancolique
     Tempo di minuetto
     Élégie in E minor
     Caprice in E major
     Nocturne in F major
 Pastorale for violin and organ (or piano), Op. 17 (1901)
 Zwei Stücke (2 Pieces) for violin and piano, Op. 19 (1901)
      2. An der Wiege 
 Fünf lyrische Tonstücke (5 Lyric Tone Pieces) for violin and piano, Op. 34 (1904)
 Suite No. 1 in D minor for violin and piano, Op. 38 (1909)
     Präludium
     Courante
     Menuetto
     Bourrée
     Air
     Tambourin
 Sechs Stücke (6 Pieces) for viola and piano, Op.39 (1910)
     Klage (Lament; Plainte)
     Und meine Seele spannte weit ihre Flügel aus (And My Soul Spread Out Its Wings; Et mon âme ouvrait ses ailes)
     Erhebung und Trost (Elevation and Consolation; Éspoir et consolation)
     Eine Erinnerung (A Recollection; Un souvenir)
     Valse Impromptu
     Schlummerlied (Lullaby; Berceuse)
 Sechs lyrische Stücke (6 Lyric Pieces) for violin and piano, Op. 42 (1910)
 Zwei Charakterstücke (2 Character Pieces) for violin and piano, Op. 44 (1909)
 Serenade in D minor for violin and viola, Op.45 (1911)
 Drei Romanzen (3 Romances) for viola and piano, Op.46 (1912)
 Vier Phantasiestücke (4 Fantasy Pieces) for viola and piano, Op.48 (1912)
     Spielmannsweise
     Capriccio
     Gruss in die Ferne
     Reigen
 Schumanniana for violin, viola and piano (1919); based on themes of Robert Schumann
 Vierzehn Präludien (14 Preludes) for violin solo, Op. 62 (1932)

Cadenzas
 Kadenzen zum Viotti-Konzert Nr. 23, G Dur (Cadenzas to Violin Concerto No. 23 in G major by Giovanni Battista Viotti) (published 1930)
 Cadenza to Viola concerto D major op. 1 by Carl Stamitz

Piano
 Sechs Phantasiestücke (6 Fantasy Pieces), Op. 5 (1879)
 Drei Mazurkas (3 Mazurkas), Op. 7 (1879)
 Zwei Romanzen (2 Romances), Op. 8 (published 1891)
     in A major
     in F major
 Sechs Clavierstücke (6 Piano Pieces), Op. 10 (1886 or 1887); revised version published in 1899 as Sechs kleine Vortragsstücke (6 Little Concert Pieces)
     Frühlingsgruß
     Blatt im Winde
     Abendstimmung
     Mazurka (A major)
     Albumblatt
     Alla Tarantella
 Acht Fantasiestücke (8 Fantasy Pieces), Op. 12 (1893)
 Fünf Stücke (5 Pieces), Op. 23 (1901)
 Vier Stücke (4 Pieces), Op. 37 (1909)
     Abendstimmung (At Eventide)
     Humoreske
     Ein Lied vom Scheiden (At Parting)
     Barcarole
 Sechs Fantasiestücke (6 Fantasy Pieces), Op. 47 (1914)
 Fünf Fantasiestücke (5 Fantasy Pieces), Op. 49 (1917)
 Fünf Klavierstücke (5 Piano Pieces), Op. 54 (1922)
 Elegie – "Eigentum von Lisbeth Holzheu" (owned by Lisbeth Holzheu)
 Sehr ruhig – "Eigentum von Lisbeth Holzheu" (owned by Lisbeth Holzheu)

Vocal
 Sechs zweistimmige Lieder (6 Two-Voice Songs) for 2 voices and piano, Op. 3 (1885)
     Ich weiss ja nicht, was kommen wird; words by A. Aar
     Dein Bild; words by Hoffmann von Fallersleben
     Ergebung; words by Paul Heyse
     Brautlied; words by Paul Heyse
     Du bist so weit; words by A. Aar
     Treueste Liebe; words by Paul Heyse
 Trauungslied (Wedding Song) for voice and piano, Op. 6 (published 1900); words by Karl Johann Philipp Spitta
 Drei Lieder (5 Songs) for alto and piano, Op. 13 (1894)
     Abendlied: Ruhe umhüllt; words by Franz Grillparzer
     Deinem Blick mich zu bequemen; words by Johann Wolfgang von Goethe
     Wenn deine Arme halten; words by Karl Vohsen
 Fünf Lieder (5 Songs) for mezzo-soprano or alto and piano, Op. 14 (1894)
      
     Lass die wilden Wogen toben; words by Hoffmann von Fallersleben
     Georgia's Hügel ruh'n; words by Friedrich von Bodenstedt
     An dich verschwendet; words by Paul Heyse
     Du mit den schwarzen Augen; words by Emanuel Geibel
 Vier Lieder (4 Songs) for voice and piano, Op. 15 (1900)
     Über die Haide geht sausend des Herbstes Wind
     Serenade: Die Sterne blinken in Silberpracht
     Leid: Drunten im Grunde, ihr Blümelein blau
     Des Abends: Die Abendglocken läuten
 Drei duette (3 Duets) for mezzo-soprano, baritone and piano (1903); words by Julius Gersdorff; English words by Alice Mattulath
     Denkst Du der Stunden (Dost Thou Remember)
     Ihr Sterne und ihr Blumen (I See the Stars above Me)
     Wenn die Rosen blühn (Love, When the Roses Bloom)
 Fünf elegische Gesänge (5 Elegiac Songs) for mezzo-soprano or alto and piano, Op. 53 (1918); words by Alexandra Rafaele
     Sonnenwende
     In der Stille
     Nun gehn die Stürme schlafen
     Die Felder rauschen
     Bitte
 Vier Lieder (4 Songs) for medium voice with violin and piano, Op. 59 (1924)
     Vor Tagesgrauen
     Im Mittagsschweigen
     Wilde Rose und erste Liebe
     Tanzlied im Mai

Choral
 Die deutsche Mutter for alto, female chorus and piano, Op. 50 (1918); words by Isolde Kurz
 Lagarde (11. August 1914) for male chorus a cappella, Op. 51 (1918); words by Albert Korn

Sources
 Forbes, Watson, "Klengel, Paul", The New Grove Dictionary of Music and Musicians, Volume 10, page 108 (London: Macmillan, 1980), 20 vols.

References

External links
 

1854 births
1935 deaths
German classical composers
German classical musicians
German classical pianists
Male classical pianists
German classical violinists
Male classical violinists
German violinists
German male violinists
German classical violists
German conductors (music)
German male conductors (music)
German male classical composers
German pianists
German male pianists